Pidgin is a simplified language that develops between two or more groups who do not share a common language, as contrasted to a Creole language, a full language with native speakers, often originating from a Pidgin language. 

Pidgin may also refer to:

 Any one of several particular Pidgin languages commonly called "Pidgin".
 Pidgin (software), an instant messaging client formerly known as Gaim
 Pidgin code, a mixture of several programming languages in the same program

See also 
 Melanesian Pidgin (disambiguation)
 
 
 Broken English (disambiguation)
 Creole (disambiguation)
 Pidgeon (disambiguation)
 Pigeon (disambiguation)